Wolfgang Laib (born 25 March 1950 in Metzingen, Germany) is a German artist, predominantly known as a sculptor. He lives and works in a small village in southern Germany, maintaining studios in New York and South India.

His work has been exhibited worldwide in many of the most important galleries and museums. He represented Germany in the 1982, Venice Biennale and was included  with his works in the Documenta 7 in 1982, and then in the Documenta 8 in 1987. In 2015, he received the Praemium Imperiale for sculpture in Tokyo, Japan.

He became world-renowned for his "Milkstones", a pure geometry of white marble made complete with milk, as well as his vibrant installations of pollen. In 2013 The Museum of Modern Art in New York City presented his largest pollen piece – 7 m × 8 m – in the central atrium of the museum.

Life and work
Wolfgang Laib was born 25 March 1950 in Metzingen, Germany, the son of a medical doctor Gustav Laib and his wife Lydia. In 1962 the family moved to a small village near to Biberach an der Riss, There his father had built a contemporary glass house of extreme and unique architecture set in a surroundings of meadows and forests. The life which developed there had a strong and remarkable impact on all the members of the family.

Jakob Braeckle, a landscape painter of the region, became a close friend of the Laibs and conveyed his deep respect and love for art. Through him the Laibs became personally acquainted with the paintings by Kazimir Malevich which were stored in Biberach by the architect Hugo Haering, having been later acquired by the Stedelijk Museum in Amsterdam. Through this friendship Laib became acquainted already in his early childhood with eastern culture and philosophies, together developing a very strong interest, especially in Lao-tse, Taoism and Zen Buddhism.

The family began to travel throughout Europe visiting those places where art, traces and treasures of the medieval culture are preserved. Assisi and the life and teachings of Saint Francis served as a very important influence upon Laib, his life and work. As the tendency toward travel developed, Laib journeyed outward to many different Asian countries, especially India.

In spite of his ever-growing passion for art, Laib begins to study medicine at the University of Tuebingen in 1968. As his studies progressed he began to question more and more what the medicine of this century actually is and means. Disillusioned with western medicine, he came to view the natural sciences, as well as most other modern thinking, as limited for their dependency on logic and the material world. His search led him to Eastern spiritualism, philosophy and pre-Renaissance thought. At this point Laib engaged himself in parallel studies of Sanskrit and eastern philosophies. In 1972, still in the middle of his medical studies, he began to work on a stone sculpture called "Brahmanda" – or "cosmic egg" in Sanskrit. At this moment Laib decided to finish his medical studies, but with the full intent of embarking on the career of an artist.

Consisting of a rectangular polished pure white marble, the top center of the surface is sanded down to create a most subtle depression, into which Laib fills the milk, thus allowing the unity of the ephemeral milk with the solid density of the white marble.

In 1977, Laib began to collect pollen in the meadows and forests around the vicinity of his village. For many days and months, from early spring into summer he continued like this for decades up to the present. This engagement became a most important substance to his daily life. The pollen is presented in exhibitions in a variety of ways, best known as a radiant field sifted on the floor in a softened rectangular form providing a rich intensity of experience and emotion. In other special situations, the pollen could be presented in simple glass jars or piled openly in small mountains.

In 1976, he had his first exhibition at gallery Mueller–Roth in Stuttgart showing the early Milkstones. This was the beginning of many exhibitions around the world over many decades. In 1979 and 1981, he had his first exhibitions in New York. He lived and worked in Tribeca, a time during which he met Carolyn Reep, a conservator specialized in Asian art and antiquities, who would then after become his wife. In 1982, he took part in the Documenta 7 and represented Germany in the Venice Biennale together with Hanne Darboven and Gotthard Graubner.

In 1985, Carolyn moved to Germany and as his wife accompanied Laib over many decades until the present. This became a very intense and beautiful relationship, sharing the life, work and values they were seeking to achieve. In 1986, their daughter Chandra Maria was born.

Since 1983, onwards his involvement with materials progressed into rice, beeswax, sealing wax, Burmese lacquer and some metals. At first he made smaller beeswax pieces which then developed into major large-scale pieces like beeswax chambers and stepped pyramids called "Zikkurats". His selection of those materials are deeply meaningful, but they do not at all represent the limit of his intent in their essence; rather they serve as vehicles to by far greater complex ideas. He has always been less concerned with innovation  or formal development than with the notion of continuity. His oeuvre is not to be approached in a chronological order, but in a cyclical manner, as he uses the same forms and materials regularly. Laib considers himself as a vehicle for ideas of universality and timelessness that are already present in nature. In his work, the micro often connects to the macro in a way that reconfigures our place in the universe. He can be quoted by saying: “I did with my art works what I wanted to do as a doctor. I never changed my profession.” In 2000, he creates the first permanent wax chamber in Roc del Maure in the Pyrenees mountains near Perpignan. Other wax chambers follow near his studio in southern Germany, in the lower Engadin in Switzerland, in the Phillips Collection in Washington, D.C., and a 50-meter-long corridor for Anselm Kiefer in Barjac, southern France, realized in 2014.

In 2006, he finally decided to have a studio in a small village in the hills near Madurai in South India. Spending there at least two months yearly, he creates a whole body of new works with black granite, white ashes among some other materials. He made a proposal of a huge Brahmanda – 20 m long – on Pulimalai, a bare granite hill – nearby Madurai.

In 2010, Carolyn and Wolfgang purchased a small space in Manhattan to function as a sharing place of their life and works in this world crossroads, forging new relations within the art world in the US.

Exhibitions and installations 

 1976 : first exhibition at gallery Mueller-Roth, Stuttgart
 1982 : Wolfgang Laib represents (Germany) in the Venice Biennale together with Hanne Darboven and Gotthard Graubner
 1982 and 1987 : Laib participates in Documenta 7 and 8
 1985 : Harald Szeemann invites Laib to participate in an exhibition "Spuren, Skulpturen und Monumente ihrer praezisen Reise" in Kunsthaus Zurich where he shows the pollen mountains "“The Five Mountains not to Climb on".  Both feel that this work unites their visions and dreams about art and their life. This becomes the beginning of  a long and intense relationship with many exhibitions worldwide.
 2000 : Laib realizes his first permanent wax chamber in the mountains of the southern Pyrenees, Roc del Maure, near Perpignan, France
 2000 – 2002 : a major retrospective, curated by Klaus Ottmann, is shown in five important American museums, first at the Hirshhorn Museum and Sculpture Garden, Washington D.C. and will be shown last at the Haus der Kunst in Munich
 2002 – 2003 : major exhibitions in museums in Japan and Korea, among them The National Museum of Modern Art, Tokyo, the Municipal Museum of Art, Toyota City and The National Museum of Contemporary Art, Seoul
 2004 : He realizes a major wax chamber near his studio in southern Germany
 2005 : the Fondation Beyeler in Basel dedicates  a major exhibition to him
 2010 : Laib makes a proposal for a huge Brahmanda – 20 m long – on Pulimalai, a bare granite hill near Madurai, South India
 2013 : The Museum of Modern Art in New York exhibits a huge pollen piece – 7 m x 8 m – in the main atrium of the museum. At the same time he realizes a permanent wax chamber in the Phillips Collection in Washington D.C.
 2014 : Anselm Kiefer invites him to create a huge wax corridor – 50 m long – in Barjac, Southern France. Laib exhibits his big beeswax steppyramid "Zikkurat" in the Basilica Sant’Apollinare in Classe, Ravenna, Italy

Over many years the following galleries showed his work up to the present:

 Gallery Konrad Fischer, Duesseldorf, Germany
 Gallery Sperone Westwater, New York
 Gallery Buchmann, Berlin, Lugano
 Gallery Thaddaeus Ropac, Salzburg, Paris
 Gallery Kenji Taki, Tokyo, Nagoya
 Gallery Alfonso Artiaco, Naples

Monographs and catalogues

 Museum MASI Lugano: Franciolli, Marco and Menegoi, Simone. Wolfgang Laib. Lugano, MASI and Edizioni Casagrande, 2017. Contains a detailed chronology of the artist
 Ravenna: Wolfgang Laib at Sant’Apollinare in Classe. With texts selected by Wolfgang Laib and an interview with the artist by Maria Rita Bentini. Gian Enzo Sperone, Turin 2016
 Fondazione Merz: Wolfgang Laib.Mahayagna – vedic fire ritual – with Brahmins from South India. Texts by Beatrice Merz and Maria Centonze, Federico Squarcini, interview with the artist by Klaus Ottmann, Turin 2009
 Museum Grenoble: Wolfgang Laib. Without place – without time – without body. Text by Guy Tosatto, selected texts by Wolfgang Laib. Musée de Grenoble and Actes Sud 2008
 Museum Reina Sofia Madrid: Wolfgang Laib. Sin Principio Sin Fin. Texts by Antonio Gamoneda, José Maria-Medina and Carlos Ortega. Museo Nacional Centro de Arte Reina Sofia. Madrid 2007
 Fondation Beyeler, Basel: Wolfgang Laib. Das Vergängliche ist das Ewige. Texts by Katharina Schmidt, Philipp Büttner, Ulf Küster, Christoph Vitali, Harald Szeemann and Wolfgang Laib. With a short chronology of the artist. Fondation Beyeler and Hatje Cantz, Basel, 2005
 Museum Macro, Rome: Wolfgang Laib. Text by Danilo Eccher. Museo Macro Roma and Electa Editore, Milano, 2005. With a chronology of the artist and a bibliography
 Kunstmuseum Bonn and De Pont Museum, Tilburg: The Essence of the Real. Wolfgang Laib. Drawings and Photographs. Texts by Christoph Schreier and Klaus Ottmann. Kunstmuseum Bonn and De Pont Museum Tilburg, 2005
 Toyota Municipal Museum of Art:  Wolfgang Laib.Text by Tadashi Kanai. Toyota City, 2003
 National Museum of  Contemporary Art, Seoul: Wolfgang Laib. Text by Seungwan Kang and Others, Seoul, 2003
 The National Museum of Modern Art, Tokyo: Wolfgang Laib. Text by Tohru Matsumoto, Tokyo, 2003
 Retrospective USA and German version Haus der Kunst:  Wolfgang Laib. A Retrospective. Texts by Klaus Ottmann, Margit Rowell, Conversation with the artist by Harald Szeemann. With a chronology and a bibliography. English version: AFA and Hatje Cantz, 2000 German version: Haus der Kunst and Hatje Cantz, 2002
 Kunsthaus Bregenz: Wolfgang Laib. Text by Elisabeth Samsonow. Interview with the artist by Rudolf Sagmeister. Bregenz 1999
 Museum Carré d’Art, Nîmes: Wolfgang Laib. Somewhere Else. Text by Guy Tosatto. Nîmes 1999
 Kunstmuseum Bonn and The Museum of Contemporary Art Los Angeles: Wolfgang Laib. Texts by Klaus Schrenk, Kerry Brougher and Donald Kuspit Bonn, Los Angeles, 1992
 Museum Ascona: Wolfgang Laib.Text by Harald Szeemann. Ascona, 1992
 Museum Capc Bordeaux: Wolfgang Laib. Text by Jean-Marc Avrilla. Bordeaux 1992
 Kunstverein Stuttgart: Wolfgang Laib. Texts by Tilman Osterwold, Johannes Cladders, Hans-Joachim Müller, Harald Szeemann, Stuttgart 1989
 ARC – Musée d’Art Moderne de la Ville de Paris: Wolfgang Laib. Text by Harald Szeemann, Interview with the artist by Suzanne Pagé, Paris, 1986              
 Venice Biennale, German Pavillon:  Wolfgang Laib. Text by Johannes Cladders. Venice 1982 and Museum Abteiberg, Mönchengladbach, 1983
 Kunstraum München: Wolfgang Laib.Text by Hermann Kern. München 1978

Awards
 1987 : Arnold Bode Preis
 2015 : Praemium Imperiale for Sculpture in Tokyo

Collection

 Museum of Modern Art, New York
 The Hirshhorn Museum and Sculpture Garden, Washington D.C.
 The Phillips Collection, Washington D.C.
 The Art Institute Chicago
 The Museum of Modern Art, San Francisco
 Centre Pompidou, Paris
 Musée de Grenoble
 Carré d’Art Nîmes
 Musée de Rochechouart
 Kunsthaus Zurich
 Museum St Gallen
 LAC Lugano
 The National Museum of Modern Art, Tokyo
 Toyota Municipal Museum of Art, Toyoto City, Japan
 The National Museum of Contemporary Art, Seoul
 Leum, Seoul
 The National Gallery of Australia, Canberra
 The Museum of New South Wales, Sydney
 The Museum of Modern and Contemporary Art, Helsinki
 De Pont Museum, Tilburg, Netherlands
 Pinakothek der Moderne, Munich
 Kunstmuseum Stuttgart
 Kunstmuseum Bonn
 Kunsthalle Karlsruhe
 Sprengel Museum, Hannover

References 

 

German conceptual artists
German contemporary artists
Land artists
Minimalist artists
1950 births
Living people